Buonalbergo is a comune (municipality) in the Province of Benevento in the Italian region Campania, located about 70 km northeast of Naples and about twenty kilometers northeast of Benevento.

Buonalbergo borders the following municipalities: Apice, Casalbore, Montecalvo Irpino, Paduli, San Giorgio La Molara, Sant'Arcangelo Trimonte.

References

Cities and towns in Campania